Trung Ly (born 1975) is a Vietnamese martial artist, fight choreographer and action director. He is known as the fight choreographer for Roger Corman's martial arts movie Fist of the Dragon, the ABC TV series kung fu comedy Maximum Choppage and recently as an action director on Truong Ngoc Anh's Vietnamese police film Tracer.

Early life 
Ly was born in 1975 in Saigon, Vietnam. Both his parents fled the country and migrated to Sydney, Australia. Trung Ly arrived in Australia in 1980 and grew up in the suburbs of Sydney.

Trung Ly started learning martial arts in 1984, Vovinam and Shaolin Kung Fu until 1997 when he moved on to Hapkido.

He attended Belmore Public School and went on to Canley Vale High School.

He went to University of Western Sydney in 1996, and studied engineering. He is a licensed aircraft maintenance engineer, mechanical and avionics.

Career

Martial Arts Practitioner  
Trung Ly was part of a non-profit organisation, Dong Tam Association, for over 20 years helping and teaching young Vietnamese Australians their culture and the martial arts ways in which honor, respect and righteousness is the essence of the culture. He transformed the Dong Tam Lion Dance School into one of the largest Vietnamese Lion Dance groups in the south west region of Sydney. He is the founder of Dong Thanh Alliance Martial Arts centre based in Chipping Norton N.S.W. The school has been described as "a catalyst for cultural diversity that brings traditional development and modern techniques to the table".

Fight Choreographer/Action Director 
In 2013 Trung Ly, as a fight choreographer, teamed up with Maria Tran and Adrian Castro to make an action comedy short called Enter The Dojo, Gaffa and followed by the award-winning Hit Girls, which won two Action on Film Festival awards in L.A.

Ly went on to make two films with director Antony Szeto, Fist of the Dragon and Death Mist, as a fight action choreographer and action camera operator.

Then Won 2 awards at the Action on Film Festival in L.A. .One of the awards is for best action sequence in a featured film shared by the action actors and the other award is for best choreography in a feature film 2016 for the crazy and awesome action in the movie Fist of the Dragon.

Ly takes pride in his action stories. "To create the story within the action and build the character through non-verbal means, it’s usually done not only for one action sequence, but to help build the character throughout the whole film. So the character’s 'action continuity' is very important for me. Devising safe and exciting action requires training in a way that has an assessment and reassessment component that needs to be regularly updated."

In 2015, Ly took on the role as action director on Vietnam's blockbuster action movie Tracer.

He is currently working on Fury of the Far East, a supernatural martial arts comedy.

Awards/Achievements

Trung Ly successes come from he's professional background and in depth knowledge of martial arts, problem solving and leadership skills which lead him to win best action sequence in a martial arts feature   and also best choreography of a feature film.

Nominations

Best Action choreography in a feature IDTV action festival.

Best fight choreography in a feature AOF action of film Festival.

References

External links 
 

Vietnamese film directors
Australian people of Vietnamese descent
People from Ho Chi Minh City
1975 births
Living people